Third Division Football Tournament is the third division of the Maldives Football League System, organized by the Football Association of Maldives.

A new structure for the Third Division Football Tournament was introduced for the 2015 season.

Structure
Changes were brought to the third division league structure 23 December 2014, by the FAM's FIFA normalizing committee.

According to the new structure, the third division consists of 9 zones under 2 groups. Joint zone 1—8 includes clubs from all atolls of the Maldives, and zone 9 is played between clubs from Male'.

Both zones plays own qualification tournament and the champion clubs will be qualified for the final round, which is also referred as Male' round. The final round consists of 10 clubs  divided into two groups of five. Each club plays against the othe in the group once and the top two clubs advance into the semi finals. Winners of the semi finals will be promoted to the next season's Second Division Football Tournament.

List of winners
2006: Red Line Club
2007: Mahibadhoo SC
2008: LT Sports Club
2009: Dhivehi Sifainge Club
2010: JJ Sports Club
2011: Club Zefrol
2012: Mahibadhoo SC
2013: Huravee Initiative for Youth
2014: Dhivehi Sifainge Club
2015: Da Grande Sports Club
2016: VK Sports Club
2017: Dhivehi Sifainge Club
2018: Rock Street Sports Club
2021: Buru Sports Club
2022: TBA

See also 
 List of football clubs in Maldives

References

External links
 
 Third Division at Haveeru Online (in Dhivehi)

  
3